A. C. Wagner may refer to:

Adam C. Wagner, German-American architect who designed breweries including the American Brewing Company Plant
Albert C. Wagner (1911–1987), director of New Jersey's Department of Corrections
Albert C. Wagner Youth Correctional Facility in Chesterfield, New Jersey